Julián Gorospe Artabe (born 22 March 1960 in Mañaria) is a Spanish former professional road racing cyclist, who rode professionally between 1982 and 1994, entirely for the  team.

Major results

1977
 1st  Road race, National Junior Road Championships
1981
 1st Memorial Valenciaga
 1st Volta da Ascension
1983
 1st Overall Tour of the Basque Country
 1st Trofeo Masferrer
1984
 1st Overall Vuelta a Andalucía
 6th Overall Vuelta a España
1st Stages 14 & 18b
1985
 1st Gran Premio de Llodio
 1st Legazpia
1986
 1st Stage 19 Tour de France
1987
 1st Fuenlabrada
 1st Klasika Primavera
1990
 1st Overall Tour of the Basque Country
1991
 1st Virgen de Doleta
1992
 1st Trofeo Comunidad Foral de Navarra
1993
 1st Overall Volta a la Comunitat Valenciana
 1st Overall Vuelta a Andalucía
 1st Pamplona

External links

Living people
Cyclists from the Basque Country (autonomous community)
Spanish male cyclists
1960 births
Spanish Tour de France stage winners
Spanish Vuelta a España stage winners
People from Durangaldea
Sportspeople from Biscay